Kafoa, or Jafoo, is a Papuan language of Alor Island in the Alor archipelago of Indonesia. The name "Kafoa" is not recognized by speakers; it is not clear which name they use themselves. Kafoa speakers are frequently multilingual, also speaking Malay, Klon and Abui. Children are typically initially taught Malay by their parents and later acquire Kafoa after having reached school age.

Phonology

The data in this section are taken from Baird (2017).

Consonants

Vowels

External links
 Kafoa untuk Selamanya (Indonesian-language film)
 Kafoa at The Language Archive

References

Alor–Pantar languages